The family of North Huon Gulf languages is a subgroup of the Huon Gulf languages of Papua New Guinea.

It consists of three languages, all of which are distinguished by severe truncation of many inherited roots and the compensatory development of suprasegmentals on vowels: phonemic tone in Yabem and Bukawa (Ross 1993) and nasalization in Kela (Johnson 1994).

Languages 
 Yabem
 Bukawa
 Kela

Footnotes

References
 Eckermann, W. (2007). A descriptive grammar of the Bukawa language of the Morobe Province of Papua New Guinea. PL585. Canberra: Pacific Linguistics.
 Johnson, Morris (1994). Kela organised phonology data.
 Ross, Malcolm (1988). Proto Oceanic and the Austronesian languages of western Melanesia. Canberra: Pacific Linguistics.
 Ross, Malcolm (1993). "Tonogenesis in the North Huon Gulf chain." In Jerold A. Edmondson and Kenneth J. Gregerson, eds., Tonality in Austronesian languages, 133–153. Oceanic Linguistics Special Publication No. 24. Honolulu: University of Hawai‘i Press.

 
Huon Gulf languages
Languages of Morobe Province
Tonal languages in non-tonal families